Kosovo is a village in Plovdiv Province, Bulgaria.

Geography 

Kosovo is located in Rhodope Mountains, in their central part, five kilometers away from a spa. It is surrounded with untouched nature, with four rivers flowing through it. It could be easily reached from cities of Asenovgrad (30 km), Pamporovo (36 km), Plovdiv (50 km) and Sofia (197 km).

History 

Kosovo was settled in the 17th century by settlers from Staro Selo near . Its pinnacle was in the late 19th century, and houses from this age still remain today. In the 20th century the village went into decline.

Culture 

Kosovo has typical Rhodope architecture. It has 63 cultural monuments, of which five have national significance. Most known is the Church of Ascension from 1851. The village has its own ethnographic museum.

Miscellaneous 

The village has typical Rhodope kitchen.

External links 
Village site

Villages in Plovdiv Province